Verkhniye Termy (Ürge Tirmä) is a rural locality (a selo) in Yeremeyevsky Selsoviet, Chishminsky District, Bashkortostan, Russia. The population was 303 as of 2010. There are 6 streets.

Geography 
Verkhniye Termy is located 15 km west of Chishmy (the district's administrative centre) by road. Slak is the nearest rural locality.

References 

Rural localities in Chishminsky District